Nathaniel Shilkret (December 25, 1889 – February 18, 1982) was an American musician, composer, conductor and musical director.

Early career
Shilkret (originally named Natan Schüldkraut) was born in New York City, United States, to parents who emigrated from Lemberg (now Lviv in Ukraine). His father played a number of instruments, and made certain that Nat and his three brothers were all accomplished musicians at an early age. Older brother Lew Shilkret was a fine pianist who also worked in the insurance industry. Younger brother Jack Shilkret had a career that paralleled Nathaniel's career: he played clarinet and piano, recorded extensively, and conducted and played piano on the radio and in motion pictures. The youngest brother Harry Shilkret was a medical doctor, who worked his way through school playing trumpet, and continued to play trumpet frequently in Nathaniel's orchestras, particularly for radio broadcasts, long after he was a practicing allergist. Nathaniel Shilkret's brother-in-law, Nathaniel Finston, was a violinist in many organizations in his youth and was musical director for Paramount Pictures and later for Metro-Goldwyn-Mayer, at one time being Nathaniel Shilkret's boss.

Shilkret was a child prodigy, touring the country with the New York Boys' Orchestra from the ages of seven to thirteen as their clarinet soloist. From his late teens to mid-twenties he was a clarinetist in the best New York music organizations, including the New York Philharmonic Society (under Vasily Safonov and Gustav Mahler), the New York Symphony Orchestra, the Metropolitan Opera House Orchestra, the Russian Symphony Orchestra, Victor Herbert's Orchestra, Arnold Volpe's Orchestra, Sousa's Grand Concert Band, Arthur Pryor's Band, and Edwin Franko Goldman's Band. He was also a rehearsal pianist for Walter Damrosch, playing for stars who included dancer Isadora Duncan.

In June 1914, he married Anne Finston (née Anna Finston aka Finkelstein; 1895–1958), sister of a fellow musician Nathaniel Finston (né Nathaniel William Finkelstein; 1890–1979). Nathaniel Shilkret and Anna Finston had a son, Arthur Shilkret (1915–1982).

He joined the Foreign Department of the Victor Talking Machine Company (later RCA Victor) around 1915, and soon was made manager of the department.

In 1926, Shilkret became "director of light music" for Victor. He directed thousands of recordings, possibly more than anyone in recording history. His son Arthur estimated the sales of these records was of the order of 50 million copies. He formed, wrote arrangements for, and conducted the Victor Salon Orchestra. He was the conductor of choice for many of Victor's innovative recordings. He conducted Victor's first record made by the electrical process in 1925, the first commercial (albeit unsuccessful) Victor Long Playing record in 1931, and was the first conductor to successfully dub an electrically recorded orchestral accompaniment over the acoustically recorded vocals of Enrico Caruso, Victor's star recording artist, who died in 1921, before electrical recording was developed. The premiere recording of George Gershwin's symphonic poem An American in Paris, in 1929, was one of five conducted by Shilkret that later earned Grammy Awards. Shilkret also conducted Paul Whiteman's Orchestra in the first electrical recording of Gershwin's Rhapsody in Blue in 1927 (after Whiteman refused to conduct following a disagreement with Gershwin).

Radio and the recording studio
He was also one of radio's earliest stars, estimating that he made over 3000 broadcasts between 1925 and 1941, including being the conductor for The Eveready Hour, regarded as the first major commercial broadcast and the first major variety show. His sponsors included Camel, Carnation, Chesterfield, Esso, Eveready, General Electric, General Motors, Hires Root Beer, Knickerbocker, Lysol, Maxwell House, Mobil Oil, Palmolive, RCA Victor, Salada tea and Smith Brothers' Cough Drops.

Between his conducting for records and for radio, virtually every musical star of the day performed under the baton of Nathaniel Shilkret. His orchestra members included Jimmy Dorsey, Tommy Dorsey, Benny Goodman, Lionel Hampton, Glenn Miller, Artie Shaw, Mike Mosiello, Joe Lipman and Del Staigers. George Gershwin, Jascha Heifetz, Mischa Elman and Andrés Segovia all played under his direction. Opera stars Rose Bampton, Lucrezia Bori, Feodor Chaliapin, Jon Crain, Richard Crooks, Miguel Fleta, Emilio de Gogorza, Amelita Galli-Curci, Mary Garden, Beniamino Gigli, Helen Jepson, Maria Jeritza, Giovanni Martinelli, Nino Martini, John McCormack, James Melton, Grace Moore, Jan Peerce, Lily Pons, Rosa Ponselle, Elisabeth Rethberg, Gladys Rice, Tito Schipa, Gladys Swarthout, John Charles Thomas, and Lawrence Tibbett were all conducted by Nathaniel Shilkret in their recordings of light-classical and popular songs. The lists of popular singers and foreign artists that played under his direction are just as impressive.

Compositions

He composed and arranged thousands of pieces. His best-known popular composition was "The Lonesome Road", first sung by co-writer Gene Austin, and later by Jules Bledsoe (dubbing Stepin Fetchit) in the final scene of the 1929 part-talkie film version of Show Boat, and recorded by more than two hundred artists, including Louis Armstrong, Bing Crosby, Frank Sinatra and Paul Robeson. He composed the theme song "Lady Divine" for the Academy Award-winning film The Divine Lady in 1929. He also composed the theme song "Some Sweet Day" for the film Children of the Ritz in the same year. His composition "Jeannine, I Dream of Lilac Time" sold almost two million copies of sheet music and was also recorded by over a hundred top artists, including Louis Armstrong, Skitch Henderson, Guy Lombardo, The London Philharmonic Orchestra, John McCormack, Mitch Miller, Hugo Montenegro, The Platters, and Lawrence Welk.

His Concerto for Trombone was premiered in 1945 by Tommy Dorsey, playing with the New York Symphony Orchestra, under the direction of Leopold Stokowski. The piece was unavailable to the public from the mid-1950s until Scottish trombonist Bryan Free rescued it from obscurity at the beginning of the 21st century. It was re-premiered at Carnegie Hall by the New York Pops, under the direction of Skitch Henderson, with Jim Pugh as soloist. Since its revival, the Concerto for Trombone has been performed about eighty times (with more performances scheduled) in the United States, Canada and several European countries.

Later career
Shilkret left RCA Victor in mid-1935, but continued to record occasionally for the company. His last recording released on the Victor label was the American Banjo Album (P-218) recorded in October 1946. This album was reissued shortly after the Victor issue as one side of an LP under the Aztec label.

Shilkret moved to Los Angeles in late 1935 and there contributed music scores and musical direction for a string of Hollywood films for RKO (as musical director from 1935 to 1937), Walter Lantz Productions (one of the studio's musical directors during 1937) and Metro-Goldwyn-Mayer (as a musical director from 1942 to 1946). His films included Mary of Scotland (1936), Swing Time (1936), The Plough and the Stars, and Shall We Dance? (1937) and several films of Laurel and Hardy. He also received an Oscar nomination for his work scoring the film version of Maxwell Anderson's stage drama Winterset (1936).

In 1939, he conducted a group of soloists (including tenor Jan Peerce) and the Victor Symphony Orchestra for RCA Victor's multi-disc tribute to Victor Herbert, which were recorded following a special NBC radio broadcast, and he recorded a number of other albums in 1939 and 1940. Due to a serious abdominal operation for cancer removal, he did not conduct for most of 1941.

In 1944–45, Shilkret led the collaborative project that created Genesis Suite, a work for narrator, chorus, and orchestra based on the events in the biblical Book of Genesis. This collaboration involved Shilkret, plus six other composers who immigrated to the United States from Europe – most of whom were Jewish – contributing one movement each: Mario Castelnuovo-Tedesco, Darius Milhaud, Arnold Schoenberg, Igor Stravinsky, Alexandre Tansman and Ernst Toch. Shilkret also tried to involve Béla Bartók in the collaborative project, but this was unsuccessful.

He worked at RKO-Pathe, making short films from 1946 through the mid-1950s. During this same period he recorded at least 260 transcriptions for SESAC. He was the pit orchestra conductor for the Broadway show Paris '90 in 1952.

In 1951, Shilkret wrote the music for a brief documentary titled, The Flying Padre, that was directed by a young Stanley Kubrick.

He lived in his son's home in Franklin Square, New York from the mid-1950s, until his death in 1982. He was a great-uncle of actress Julie Warner.

References

External links

Nat Shilkret
Nathaniel Shilkret recordings at the Discography of American Historical Recordings.
, written and directed by James A. Fitzpatrick; fictional 11-minute 1925 film short about Franz Liszt; Nathaniel Shilkret appears, conducting his orchestra.

1889 births
1982 deaths
American male composers
American composers
Big band bandleaders
Musicians from New York (state)
Jewish American composers
Jewish American songwriters
Victor Records artists
Songwriters from New York (state)
20th-century American male musicians
American male songwriters